Rae-Anne Mitchell  (born ) is a retired Canadian female volleyball player, who played as a middle blocker.

She was part of the Canada women's national volleyball team at the 2002 FIVB Volleyball Women's World Championship in Germany. On club level she played with St. Cloud Suresnes.

Clubs
 St. Cloud Suresnes (2002)

References

External links
www.pgsportshalloffame.org
caaws
www.fivb.ch

1973 births
Living people
Canadian women's volleyball players
Place of birth missing (living people)
Middle blockers